The French composer Josquin des Prez was among the most prolific of his time, writing in genres that included masses, motets, chansons and frottole. Much of his output is sacred music, in which he cultivated and developed a highly sophisticated style of complex polyphony. Active during the high Renaissance, he was the central figure of the Franco-Flemish School.

The difficulties in compiling a works list for Josquin cannot be overstated. Because of his immense prestige in the early sixteenth century, many scribes and publishers did not resist the temptation of attributing anonymous or otherwise spurious works to Josquin. The German editor Georg Forster summed up the situation admirably in 1540 when he wrote, "I remember a certain eminent man saying that, now that Josquin is dead, he is putting out more works than when he was alive."<ref>Jesse Rodin, "A Josquin Substitution," Early Music 34.2 (2006), p. 246</ref> Thus, the authenticity of many of the works listed below is disputed on stylistic grounds or problems with sources or both. This thorny issue has been taken up vigorously in the now nearly complete New Josquin Edition (NJE).

 Masses 
 Missa Ad fugam (canonic, four voices)
 Missa Ave maris stella (Rome, 1486–1495) (four voices)
 Missa D'ung aultre amer (four voices; authorship doubted by some scholars, published as authentic in NJE)
 Missa de Beata Virgine (around 1510) (four voices in parts I–II, five voices in parts III–V)
 Missa Di dadi (=N'aray je jamais) (four voices; authorship doubted by some scholars, published as authentic in NJE)
 Missa Faisant regretz (four voices)
 Missa Fortuna desperata (four voices)
 Missa Gaudeamus (four voices)
 Missa Hercules Dux Ferrariae (Ferrara, 1503/04) (four voices, six in Agnus III)
 Missa La sol fa re mi (four voices)
 Missa L'ami Baudichon (four voices)
 Missa L'homme armé sexti toni (four voices, six in Agnus III)
 Missa L'homme armé super voces musicales (four voices)
 Missa Malheur me bat (four voices, six in Agnus III)
 Missa Mater patris (four voices; authorship doubted by some scholars on stylistic grounds, published as authentic in NJE)
 Missa Pange lingua (Condé, around 1514) (four voices)
 Missa Sine nomine (four voices; canonic mass, also titled "Missa Ad fugam" in later print)
 Missa Une mousse de Biscaye (four voices; authorship doubted by some scholars, published as authentic in NJE)

Doubtful works:
 Missa Allez regrets (printed in Werken by Smijers with reservations; considered authentic by Osthoff, otherwise doubted by many; possibly by Johannes Stokem)
 Missa da pacem (four voices; authorship widely doubted; probably by Noel Bauldeweyn)

 Mass fragments 
 Credo Chascun me crie (= Des rouges nez) Credo De tous biens playne Credo Vilayge (I) Credo Vilayge (II) (of doubtful authorship)
 Credo [Quarti toni] (canonic) (of doubtful authorship except considered authentic by Urquhart)
 Gloria De beata virgine Sanctus De passione Sanctus D'ung aultre amer Motets 
 Absalon, fili mi (4vv) (attribution has been challenged; conjecturally attributed to Pierre de La Rue)
 Absolve, quaesumus, Domine/Requiem aeternam (6vv) (attribution has been challenged)
 Alma redemptoris mater;
 Alma redemptoris mater / Ave regina caelorum;
 Ave Maria ... benedicta tu (4vv);
 Ave Maria ... Virgo serena (Milan 1484/85);
 Ave munda spes, Maria (not in first complete works edition)
 Ave nobilissima creatura Ave verum corpus natum Benedicta es, caelorum regina Christum ducem, qui per crucem (4vv)
 De profundis clamavi (4vv) (possibly middle-period composition: attribution has been questioned)
 De profundis clamavi (5vv) (late composition)
 Domine exaudi orationem meam Domine, ne in furore tuo (4vv)
 Domine, non-secundum peccata nostra (2-4vv; for Rome)
 Ecce, tu pulchra es, amica mea Factum est autem Gaude virgo, mater Christi Homo quidam fecit cenam magnam Honor, decus, imperium Huc me sydereo descendere jussit Olympo (5vv)
 Illibata Dei virgo nutrix In exitu Israel de Aegypto In illo tempore assumpsit Jesus duodecim discipulos Iniquos odio habui (4vv, only tenor part survives)
 In principio erat Verbum (authenticity has been questioned)
 Inviolata, integra et casta es Maria Jubilate Deo omnis terra Liber generationis Jesu Christi Magnificat quarti toni (attributed to Josquin on stylistic grounds)
 Magnificat tertii toni (attributed to Josquin on stylistic grounds)
 Memor esto verbi tui Miserere mei Deus (Ferrara, 1503)
 Misericordias Domini in aeternum cantabo (France, 1480/83)
 Missus est Gabriel angelus ad Mariam Virginem Mittit ad virginem Monstra te esse matrem O admirabile commercium (part of a 5-motet cycle)
 O bone et dulcissime Jesu O Domine Jesu Christe (part of a Passion setting in 5 sections)
 O virgo prudentissima O virgo virginum Pater noster, qui es in caelis (Condé, 1505–1521)
 Planxit autem David Praeter rerum seriem Qui edunt me adhuc Qui habitat in adiutorio altissimi (4vv)
 Qui habitat in adiutorio altissimi (24vv)
 Qui velatus facie fuisti (part of a Passion setting in 6 sections)
 Salve regina (4vv) Salve regina (5vv, 1502) Stabat Mater Tu lumen, tu splendor Tu solus qui facis mirabilia Usquequo Domine oblivisceris me (attrib on stylistic grounds; only part survives)
 Ut Phoebi radiis Veni, sancte spiritus (also attrib to Forestier)
 Victimae paschali laudes Virgo prudentissima Virgo salutiferi (Ferrara, 1503/04)
 Vultum tuum deprecabuntur (7-part Passion cycle) (1480s)

 Motet-chansons 
 A la mort / Monstra te esse matrem Fortune destrange plummaige/Pauper sum ego
 Que vous madame / In pace in idipsum

Chansons 
 A l'heure que je vous
 A l'ombre d'ung buissonet, au matinet (3vv)
 Adieu mes amours
 Adieu mes amours (6vv or 7vv)
 Allégez moy (6vv)
 Baisé moy, ma doulce amye (4vv)
 Belle, pour l'amour de vous
 Bergerette savoyenne
 Cela sans plus
 Comment peult haver joye
 Cueur langoreulx
 De tous biens plaine (3vv)
 De tous biens plaine (4vv)
 Douleur me bat
 Du mien amant
 Dulces exuviae
 En l'ombre d'ung buissonet tout, au long (3vv)
 En l'ombre d'ung buissonet tout, au long (4vv)
 Entré je suis en grant pensée (3vv)
 Entré je suis en grant pensée (4vv)
 Fama malum
 Faulte d'argent
 Fors seulement (only one of six voice parts survives)
 Fortuna d'un gran tempo
 Helas madame
 Ile fantazies de Joskin
 Incessament livré suis à martire
 Je me complains
 Je ne me puis tenir d'aimer (5vv)
 Je n'ose plus
 Je ris et si ay larme
 Je sey bien dire
 La belle se siet
 La Bernardina
 La plus de plus
 Le villain [jaloux]
 Ma bouche rit et mon cueur pleure
 Mille Regretz (4vv)
 Mon mary m'a diffamée
 N'esse pas ung grant desplaisir
 Nymphes des bois (written for the death of Johannes Ockeghem)
 Nymphes, nappés / Circumdederunt me
 Parfons regretz
 Petite camusette
 Plaine de dueil
 Plus n'estes ma maistresse
 Plus nulz regretz (written between 1508 and 1511, commemorating the 1507 Treaty of Calais (1507));
 Plusieurs regretz
 Pour souhaitter
 Quant je vous voye
 Qui belles amours a
 Recordans de my signora
 Regretz sans fin
 Se congié prens
 Si j'ay perdu mon amy (3vv)
 Si j'ay perdu mon amy (4vv)
 Tant vous aimme Bergeronette
 Tenez moy en voz bras
 Une mousque de Biscaye;
 Vive le roy (instrumental piece, written for Louis XII)
 Vous l'arez, s'il vous plaist
 Vous ne l'arez pas
 textless (4vv)

Frottole 
 El Grillo
 In te Domine speravi per trovar pietà
 Scaramella va alla guerra

References

Sources
 Fallows, David. Josquin. Turnhout: Brepols Publishers, Second edition, 2020, .

External links
 
 

Josquin des Prez